Danaë Xanthe Vlasse (also known as Danaë Vlasse) is a French-American pianist, composer, performing artist, music producer, and music teacher.  She won a Grammy Award for Best Classical Solo Vocal Album for Mythologies in 2022.  Her song, Penelope, from the album, was featured in 2021 on PBS's Front & Center, performed by Sangeeta Kaur.

In 2022, Vlasse was inducted into the Indie Music Hall of Fame. She has also been the recipient of awards from the Producer’s Choice Awards, Clouzine International Music Awards, Indie Music Channel Awards, and Radio Music Awards, among others.

Music career
Vlasse is a classical pianist, composer, music producer, performing artist, and music teacher.  She has released six studio albums and received a Grammy award for Mythologies in 2022.  She has performed at Skirball Cultural Center, and SXSW (South by Southwest) and her compositions have been performed on PBS's Front & Center, and Segerstrom Center for the Arts, and Mt. Wilson Observatory, by Sangeeta Kaur and Hila Plitmann.

Vlasse is the director of Music Vision Studios, where she teaches piano, theory and composition. She graduated from the University of Alabama in Huntsville (UAH) in 2003 with a degree in Piano Performance and moved to Los Angeles shortly afterward to pursue her aspirations of composing music.

Early life
Vlasse was born in Bordeaux, France to a French mother and Greek father.  Her father Marcus (née Vlassopoulos) grew up on the island of Ithaca (which inspired her compositions on Mythologies) and her mother was a teacher. "I began studying music so young I don’t even remember my first piano lesson. In some sense music was so ingrained in my life that I just kept doing it because nothing else was powerful enough to pull me away from it," Vlasse said in an interview with Shoutout LA.

Discography
 2021 - Mythologies
 2020 - Poème
 2018 - Solstice
 2017 - Trilogies
 2015 - Celebrations and Commemoration
 2013 - The Swans, 12 Valses Mélancoliques

Awards
{|class="wikitable sortable"
!Year
!Nominated Work
!Category
!Award
!Result
|-
| 2022 || Danaë Xanthe Vlasse  || Classical || Indie Music Hall of Fame Inductee|| 
|-
| 2022 || Mythologies || Best Classical Solo Vocal Album || Grammy Award|| 
|-
| 2020 || Poème || Gold Medal Winner Artist/Composer || Global Music Award|| 
|-
| 2020 || Nocturne #4 || Best Classical Artist|| Radio Music Award || 
|-
| 2020 || La Mer || Best Classical Songwriter || Indie Music Channel || 
|-
| 2020 || Serenade de Verlaine || Best Classical Songwriter || Radio Music Award || 
|-
| 2020 || Rêverie||Music Video of the Year & Best Classical Music Video || Indie Music Channel Awards ||  
|-
| 2019 || Serenade II ||  Best Classical Category || Peace Song Award||  
|-
| 2019 || Serenade de Verlaine || Best Classical Producer ||Indie Music Channel Award || 
|-
| 2018 || Nocturne-Meditation || Best Classical Producer || Radio Music Award||  
|-
| 2018 || Swan Song || Outstanding Achievement Award || Cult Critic Award||  
|-
| 2018 || || Outstanding Classical Solo Artist|| Producer's Choice Honors ||  
|-
| 2018 ||  Solstice with Mischa Lefkowitz  || Best Duo and Best Album || Global Music Award||  
|-
| 2018 || Nocturne #3, (Arrangement for Piano and Orchestra with Sanchit Balhara)  || Classical Instrumental|| Hollywood Music in Media Award || 
|-
| 2018 || Trilogies|| Album of the Year || Indie Music Channel Award ||  
|-
| 2018 || Rêverie with Mischa Lefkowitz || Best Classical Duo ||Radio Music Award|| 
|-
| 2018 || Trilogies || Best Classical Album ||Independent Music Award|| 
|-
| 2018 || Trilogies || Best Instrumental Album ||CLOUZINE International Music Award||  
|-
| 2017 || Trilogies || Classical Piano Solo; Best Composition/Composer and Best Album/Silver Medal || Global Music Awards||  
|-
| 2017 || Solstice Serenade with Mischa Lefkowitz|| Best Instrumental Recording|| Radio Music Awards||  
|-
| 2017 || Intermezzo D’Anniversaire || Best New Age Artist || Hollywood Music in Media Award|| 
|-
| 2017 || Trois Chansons Sans Paroles with Mischa Lefkowitz  ||  Best Classical Song|| Indie Music Channel Award|| 
|-
| 2017 || Cloudsail  ||  Best Classical Demo|| Indie Music Channel Award|| 
|-
| 2016 || Intermezzo D’Anniversaire || Best Classical Recording|| Radio Music Award||  
|-
| 2013|| Fantasie #1 || Award of Merit ||Global Music Award||

References

20th-century classical composers
20th-century French composers
20th-century French women musicians
French women classical composers
20th-century women composers
21st-century American composers
21st-century American women musicians
21st-century women composers
Women classical pianists
Year of birth missing (living people)
Living people
20th-century women pianists
21st-century women pianists